Simon Kistemaker (29 August 1940 – 23 November 2021) was a Dutch football manager.

References

External links
 

1941 births
2021 deaths
Dutch football managers
Eredivisie managers
SC Cambuur managers
De Graafschap managers
SC Telstar managers
FC Utrecht managers
People from Velsen
Sportspeople from North Holland